Mother Mary Raphael Slattery, S.P., (January 17, 1863 – September 9, 1940) was the Superior General of the Sisters of Providence of Saint Mary-of-the-Woods, Indiana, from 1926-1938. During her term, her business sense helped the congregation through the Great Depression. In the midst of the Depression, Slattery had Saint Mary-of-the-Woods College, originally under the finances of the congregation, separately incorporated in order to protect its future.

She oversaw the founding of Providence High School in Chicago, now known as Providence St. Mel School. Slattery also sent Sisters of Providence for the first time to minister in Oklahoma, North Carolina and California.

Slattery also promoted among her religious sisters a devotion to Our Lady of Providence, encouraging them to share this devotion with their students.

Born Mary Slattery in Galesburg, Illinois, Slattery entered the congregation on September 4, 1882 and was professed as a full Sister of Providence on August 15, 1885. She spent time ministering in Valparaiso, Indiana and at Saint Agnes Academy in Indianapolis. Beginning in 1902, Slattery spent 24 years as Treasurer of the congregation until she was elected Superior General in 1926.

References

 

 

 

1863 births
1940 deaths
Sisters of Providence of Saint Mary-of-the-Woods
People from Galesburg, Illinois
Burials at the Sisters of Providence Convent Cemetery
20th-century American Roman Catholic nuns
Catholics from Illinois
19th-century American Roman Catholic nuns